The 1993 Southwestern Louisiana Ragin' Cajuns football team was an American football team that represented the University of Southwestern Louisiana (now known as the University of Louisiana at Lafayette) in the Big West Conference during the 1993 NCAA Division I-A football season. In their eighth year under head coach Nelson Stokley, the team compiled an 8–3 record and as Big West co-champion.

Schedule

References

Southwestern Louisiana
Big West Conference football champion seasons
Louisiana Ragin' Cajuns football seasons
Southwestern Louisiana Ragin' Cajuns football